Susan Van Camp is a fantasy artist, best known for her work on various role playing games.

Biography
Van Camp was born on June 11, 1959, and raised in Flint, Michigan. She began her commercial career in gaming by doing work for Steve Jackson's Car Wars series. From there she proceeded to comic books with Arrow Comics' Tales from the Aniverse in 1984, and Varcel’s Vixens from Caliber Comics. Comics led to science fiction conventions and the art shows held at the conventions, where she began painting and putting her paintings up for bidding by the public. In 1994 Van Camp began doing work for Magic: The Gathering.

She began selling her own RPG game in 1996, Dragon Storm.

Role-playing game credit
Otosan Uchi (Legend of the Five Rings) (2000), Alderac Entertainment Group; interior artist
Doomtown or Bust! (Deadlands: The Weird West) (1999), Pinnacle Entertainment Group; interior artist
Blood Enemies: Abominations of Cerilia (Birthright) (1995), TSR, Inc; interior artist
Faeries (Ars Magica) (1995), Wizards of the Coast; interior artist
Houses of Hermes (Ars Magica) (1994), Wizards of the Coast; interior artist
Earthdawn (1993), FASA Corporation; interior artist
Paranormal Animals of Europe (Shadowrun) (1993), FASA Corporation; interior artist
Citybook VI - Up Town (Catalyst) (1992), Flying Buffalo; interior artist
Central Casting: Heroes Now! (1991), Task Force Games; cover artist
Citybook V - Sideshow (Catalyst) (1991), Flying Buffalo; interior artist

Other game credits
Clout Fantasy, Base Set (2005), Hidden City Games; chip art
Tempest of the Gods, core set (1995), Black Dragon Press; card art
Galactic Empires, Primary Edition (1994), Companion Games; card art
Legends (Magic: The Gathering) (1994), Wizards of the Coast; card art
Arabian Nights (Magic: The Gathering) (1993), Wizards of the Coast; card art

Magazine article credits
"Animal Henchmen" in Dragon #269 (Mar 2000); interior artist
"The City of Lofty Pillars" in Dragon #201 (Jan 1994); interior artist
"Dungeon Mastery: Talk of the Town" in Dragon Annual #2 (1997); interior artist
"Ecology (Love-Life) of the Lamia" in Dragon #192 (Apr 1993); interior artist
"PC Portraits: Gnomes & Halflings" in Dragon #262 (Aug 1999); interior artist
"The Wizard's Companion" in Dragon #246 (Apr 1998); interior artist

Short story credits
"Dedrak's Quest" (Sci-Fi) in Dragon #250; interior artist

Notes

Sources

1959 births
Fantasy artists
Game artists
Living people
Role-playing game artists